This is a subarticle to fiqh and ulama

This is a list of important faqīh

Sunni Jurists

Shia Jurists
Jafar al-Sadiq
Muhammad al-Baqir
Abu Basir al-Moradi
Burayd ibn Mu'awiya al-'Ijli
Muhammad bin Muslim
Abu Basir al-Asadi
Safwan ibn Yahya
Zayd ibn Ali
Ibn Shahr Ashub

Mohammad Mohammad Sadeq al-Sadr
Ali Khamenei
Grand Ayatollah Ali al-Sistani
Ruhollah Khomeini

References
 

Jurists